Shaikhom Ronald Singh (born 17 February 1997) is an Indian professional footballer who plays as a midfielder for Gokulam Kerala FC in the I-League.

References

Living people
1997 births
Footballers from Manipur
Indian footballers
ATK (football club) players
TRAU FC players
NEROCA FC players
Southern Samity players
RoundGlass Punjab FC players
Association football midfielders
Indian Super League players
I-League players
Peerless SC players